The 1992 British Formula Two Championship was the fourth season of the British Formula 3000 Championship. This year the series was renamed British Formula 2, but the series was in decline with smaller grids than previous years. Champion of 1992 was Yvan Muller who drove for Omegaland. He would later race in International Formula 3000 for the same team, before becoming multiple ice racing champion and touring car star in France and Britain. Britain's Jason Elliott was second for Madgwick, with Peter Kox finishing third overall for Weylock. Future series champ José Luis Di Palma finished fourth in the standings. Other drivers making appearances included Vincenzo Sospiri and Pedro Diniz. Kiwi Craig Baird competed in an ex-Japanese F3000 Dome F102.

Drivers and teams
The following drivers and teams contested the 1992 British Formula Two Championship.

Results

British Formula Two Championship

Championship Standings

References

Formula 3000
British Formula 3000 Championship